The men's hammer throw event at the 1932 Olympic Games took place August 1. There were 14 competitors from 9 nations. The 1930 Olympic Congress in Berlin had reduced the limit from 4 athletes per NOC to 3 athletes. The event was won by Pat O'Callaghan of Ireland, repeating as Olympic champion. O'Callaghan was the third man to win multiple hammer throw medals and the second (after three-time champion John Flanagan) to repeat as gold medalist. His victory also made 7 of the first 8 Olympic hammer throw competitions won by Irish-born athletes; in addition to O'Callaghan's two victories for Ireland, five of the United States' wins were by Irish-American throwers. Ville Pörhölä took silver for Finland's first medal in the event. Peter Zaremba extended the United States' medal streak to eight Games with his bronze.

Background

This was the eighth appearance of the event, which has been held at every Summer Olympics except 1896. Four of the six finalists from the 1928 Games returned: gold medalist Pat O'Callaghan of Ireland, silver medalist Ossian Skiöld of Sweden, fourth-place finisher Armando Poggioli of Italy, and sixth-place finisher Frank Conner of the United States. Another prominent competitor was Ville Pörhölä of Finland, the 1920 shot put gold medalist. Pörhölä and O'Callaghan were the favorites.

Mexico made its debut in the event. The United States appeared for the eighth time, the only nation to have competed at each appearance of the event to that point.

Competition format

The competition continued to use the divided-final format used since 1908, with results carrying over between "rounds". Each athlete received three throws in the qualifying round. The top six men advanced to the final, where they received an additional three throws. The best result, qualifying or final, counted.

Records

These were the standing world and Olympic records (in metres) prior to the 1932 Summer Olympics.

No new world or Olympic records were set during the competition.

Schedule

Results

References

Men's hammer throw
Hammer throw at the Olympics
Men's events at the 1932 Summer Olympics